Kalou may refer to:
23663 Kalou, a main-belt asteroid
Bonaventure Kalou (born 1978), Ivorian footballer
Kalou language, a language of Papua-New Guinea
Ol Kalou, a town in Kenya
Ol Kalou Constituency, an electoral constituency in Kenya
Salomon Kalou (born 1985), Ivorian footballer
Sekonaia Kalou (born 1984), Fijian rugby player